Accra (or Gaga) is the capital and largest city of Ghana, located on the southern coast at the Gulf of Guinea, which is part of the Atlantic Ocean. As of 2021 census, the Accra Metropolitan District, had a population of 284,124 inhabitants, and the larger Greater Accra Region, had a population of 5,455,692
inhabitants. In common usage, the name "Accra" often refers to the territory of the Accra Metropolitan District as it existed before 2008, when it covered . This territory has since been split into 13 local government districts: 12 independent municipal districts (total area: 179.0 km2) and the reduced Accra Metropolitan District (20.4 km2), which is the only district within the capital to be granted city status. This territory of 199.4 km2 contained 1,782,150 inhabitants at the 2021 census, and serves as the capital of Ghana, while the district under the jurisdiction of the Accra Metropolitan Assembly proper (20.4 km2) is distinguished from the rest of the capital as the "City of Accra".

Formed from the merger of distinct settlements around British Fort James, Dutch Fort Crêvecoeur (Ussher Fort), and Danish Fort Christiansborg as Jamestown, Usshertown, and Christiansborg respectively, Accra served as the capital of the British Gold Coast between 1877 and 1957 and has since transitioned into a modern metropolis. The capital's architecture reflects this history, ranging from 19th-century colonial architecture to modern skyscrapers and apartment blocks.

Accra is the Greater Accra Region's economic and administrative hub, and serves as the anchor of the larger Greater Accra Metropolitan Area (GAMA), which is inhabited by about 4 million people, making it the thirteenth-largest metropolitan area in Africa. In 2020, the Globalization and World Cities Research Network think tank designated Accra as a "Gamma −" level global city, indicating a growing level of international influence and connectedness.

Etymology 
The word Accra is derived from the Akan word Nkran meaning "ants", a reference to the numerous anthills seen in the countryside around Accra. The name specifically refers to soldier ants, and was applied to both the town and people by the Twi speakers.

The name of Accra in the local Ga language is Ga or Gaga, the same name as that of the Ga people and a cognate with Nkran. The word is sometimes rendered with the nasalised vowels as Gã or Gãgã. Historian Carl Christian Reindorf confirmed this etymology, proposing a link between the martial qualities and migratory behavior of the local ants and those of the Ga people. The link between the ethnonym and ants was explicitly reflected in the recognition of anthills as sacred places. Often ringed by sacred fences (aklabatsa), the tall red mounds dotting Accra's hinterland were seen as microcosms of human community and as nodal points between the known world and the world of the dead.

While the Ga used the reference to the invasive species of dark-red swarming ants to connote military prowess and their ancient conquest of Guang speakers residing in the Accra Plains, the Akan-speaking appropriation and translation of this metaphor had a less than generous meaning. Instead of viewing Ga speakers as a formidable military force, the Akan-speaking term "Nkran" cast Ga peoples as pests or nuisances to be controlled or exterminated.

Ga also gave its name to the Ga districts surrounding Accra.

The spelling Accra was given to Nkran by Europeans. An earlier spelling used by the Danes was Akra.

History 

The main Ga group known as the Tumgwa Were led by Ayi Kushie arrived by sea. When the Guan (Lartehs) on the coast saw them on their canoes at sea, they looked like ants. Hence, the Lartehs refer to them as Nkran (ants). Nkran was later corrupted by the Danes to Akra, then to present-day Accra. Nkran in the Ga language is Gaga, thus they also started calling themselves Ga. Due to their sheer numbers, the indigenous Lartehs thus relocated to the Akuapem ridge.

Initially, Accra was not the most prominent trading centre; the trade hubs of the time were the ports at Ada and Prampram, along with the inland centres of Dodowa and Akuse. The Dutch built the nearby outposts of Ussher Fort while the British and the Swedes built James Fort and Christiansborg castles, respectively. By the 17th century, Portugal, France and Denmark, had constructed forts in the city.

Britain gradually acquired the interests of all other countries beginning in 1851, when Denmark sold Christiansborg (which they had acquired from the Swedes) and their other forts to the British. The Netherlands was the last to sell out, in 1871. In 1873, after decades of tension between the British and Ashantis, the British captured Kumasi, destroying portions of the city. The British then captured Accra in 1874, and in 1877, at the end of the second Anglo-Asante War, Accra replaced Cape Coast as the capital of the British Gold Coast. This decision was made because Accra had a drier climate relative to Cape Coast. Until this time, the settlement of Accra was confined between Ussher Fort to the east and the Korle Lagoon to the west.

As the newly established Gold Coast's administrative functions were moved to Accra (1877), an influx of British colonial administrators and European settlers grew around the Christiansborg (modern Osu, Ministries, Ridge, Labone, and Cantonments) began, and the city began to expand to accommodate the new residents. Victoriaborg was formed in the late 19th century as an exclusively European residential neighborhood, located to the east of the city limits of the time. The boundaries of Accra were further stretched in 1908. This expansion entailed the creation of a native-only neighborhood, intended to accommodate members of the native population as a means of relieving congestion problems in the overcrowded city center. Adabraka was thus established to the north of the city.

One of the most influential decisions in the history of the city was that of building the Accra-Kumasi railway in 1908. This was to connect Accra, the country's foremost port at that time, with Ghana's main cocoa-producing regions. In 1923, the railway was completed, and by 1924, cocoa was Ghana's largest export.

The colonial era heavily influenced the shape that Accra took during this period. For example, the segregation of European and African neighborhoods was mandated by law until 1923, and all new buildings were required to be built out of stone or concrete. Despite these regulations, European settlers in the Gold Coast were very hesitant to invest any large amount of money into the city to maintain its infrastructure or improve public works. This did not change until the governorship of Sir Frederick Gordon Guggisberg during which period the three separate settlements (Osu, La and Jamestown) merged to become modern Accra. Guggisberg's administration laid out the present grid networked neighborhoods of Tudu, Adabraka and Asylum Down.

Among the achievements of Guggisberg was the building of a bridge across the Korle Lagoon in 1923, which opened the land west of the lagoon for settlement. Guggisberg also oversaw the building of a major hospital (Korle-Bu) and secondary school (Achimota). Such improvements led to an increase in Accra's population due to the migration of rural dwellers into the city, and the immigration of increasing numbers of British businessmen and administrators.

After World War II 

In the years following World War II, the neighbourhoods of Ridge and Cantonments were planned as low-density developments for Europeans, while many rural migrants settled in neighbourhoods which had not yet been incorporated into Accra's municipal boundary, such as Nima and surrounding areas. Thus, the development of these neighbourhoods was unregulated by the government, creating a crowded and jumbled shanty-town landscape.

Another area of Accra that took shape at this time was the central business district (CBD). More administrative buildings were built on High Street, forming a massive judicial/administrative complex. Additionally, the expansion of the economy led to many more commercial buildings being built in the CBD.

In 1944, Accra's city planner Maxwell Fry devised a town plan, which was revised in 1958 by B.D.W. Treavallion and Alan Flood. Although the Fry/Trevallion plan was never followed through, it illustrated the British vision of how Accra should develop.

Fry/Treavallion plan 
In the Fry/Treavallion plan, a reorganization of the CBD was called for, as well as the development of the coastal region of the city. To reorganize the CBD, the planners decided to superimpose a tight street grid north of Fort Ussher.

To the east of this newly organized CBD, the planners hoped to preserve a broad, open space for a restaurant, country club, and polo and cricket fields. Additionally, the British planners intended to build large numbers of public squares, fountains, and ornamental pools and statues throughout the city, as well as a vast Parliament Complex in the city center. Lastly, the Fry/Treavallion plan included plans to make the coastal region an extension of the exclusive European neighborhood of Victoriaborg, and to create a recreational preserve for the elite. However, the British Gold Coast ended before the Fry/Treavallion plan was enacted.

Nkrumah Plan 

When Kwame Nkrumah became Ghana's first post-independence Prime Minister in 1957, he created his own plan for Accra's development. Instead of creating spaces to serve the elite, Nkrumah sought to create spaces to inspire pride and nationalism in his people and people throughout Africa.

Rather than creating ornamental fountains and a large Parliament complex, Nkrumah decided to build landmarks such as Independence Square, the State House, and the Organisation of African Unity building, and to refurbish Christianborg Castle. Nkrumah decided to leave the Atlantic coastal region undeveloped, so as to not detract attention from the Community Centre or Independence Square, lending both spaces symbolic significance. The Nkrumah plan did not emphasise order nearly as much as the Fry/Treavallion plan did; whereas the British plan strove to lessen crowding in the commercial district and help relieve the overcrowding of neighbourhoods bordering the CBD, the Nkrumah plan allowed for continued compression of commercial establishments into the CBD, as well as increased migration into Jamestown.

The modern city is centered on the original British, Danish, and Dutch forts and their surrounding communities: Jamestown near the British James Fort, Osu near the Danish fort of Christiansborg (now Osu Castle), and Ussherstown near the Dutch Ussher fort.

Tourist attractions include the National Museum of Ghana, the Ghana Academy of Arts and Sciences, the National Archives of Ghana and Ghana's central library, the National Theatre, the Accra Centre for National Culture, and the Jamestown Lighthouse.

The Parliament, Supreme Court of Ghana, Black Star Square and the Bank of Ghana are also located in Accra.

The city is also a transportation hub, home to the Kotoka International Airport, and railway links to Tema, Sekondi-Takoradi and Kumasi. Accra has become a location for national and international business conferences, such as the BarCamp Ghana series, organised by GhanaThink Foundation.

Geography 

Owing to its location in the Dahomey Gap, where the Gulf of Guinea and the Atlantic Ocean coast runs parallel to the prevailing moist monsoonal winds, Accra features a very marginal hot semi-arid climate (Köppen climate classification: BSh) that borders on a tropical wet and dry climate (Köppen climate classification: Aw/As). The average annual rainfall is about 730 mm, which falls primarily during Ghana's two rainy seasons. The chief rainy season begins in April and ends in mid-July, whilst a weaker second rainy season occurs in October. Rain usually falls in short intensive storms and causes local flooding in which drainage channels are obstructed.

Very little variation in temperature occurs throughout the year. The "cooler" months tend to be more humid than the warmer months. As a result, during the warmer months and particularly during the windy harmattan season, the city experiences a breezy "dry heat" that feels less warm than the "cooler" but more humid rainy season.

As a coastal city, Accra is vulnerable to the impacts of climate change and sea level rise, with population growth putting increasing pressure on the coastal areas. Drainage infrastructure is particularly at risk, which has profound implications for people's livelihoods, especially in informal settlements. Inadequate planning regulation and law enforcement, as well as perceived corruption in government processes, lack of communication across government departments and lack of concern or government co-ordination with respect to building codes are major impediments to progressing the development of Accra's drainage infrastructure, according to the Climate & Development Knowledge Network.

As Accra is close to the equator, the daylight hours are practically uniform during the year. Relative humidity is generally high, varying from 65% in the midafternoon to 95% at night. The predominant wind direction in Accra is from the WSW to NNE sectors. Wind speeds normally range between 8 and 16 km/h. High wind gusts occur with thunderstorms, which generally pass in squalls along the coast.

The maximum wind speed record in Accra is 107.4 km/h (58 knots). Strong winds associated with thunderstorm activity often cause damage to property by removing roofing material. Several areas of Accra experience microclimatic effects. Low-profile drainage basins with a north–south orientation are not as well ventilated as those oriented east–west.

Air is often trapped in pockets over the city, and an insulation effect can give rise to a local increase in air temperature of several degrees. This occurs most notably in the Accra Newtown sports complex areas.

Administration 
The administration of Accra occurs at two levels. Strategic initiatives, such as the urban transportation project, are coordinated between district authorities, while local administration is carried out by local government authorities, which are responsible for most local services, such as local planning, local roads and refuse collection within their area of jurisdiction.

The former territory of the Accra Metropolitan District, as it existed before 2008, is now divided into 13 separate local government districts, all governed as municipal assemblies with their own town hall and a municipal executive appointed by the president of the republic. Each municipal assembly is responsible for most local services, such as local planning and refuse collection. The reduced Accra Metropolitan District (also referred to as City of Accra), once comprised the entirety of Accra until the Ledzokuku, Krowor, La Dadekotopon, Ablekuma North, Ablekuma Central, Ablekuma West, Ayawaso East, Ayawaso North, Ayawaso Central, Ayawaso West, Okaikwei North, and Korley Kottey districts were carved out as separate municipal districts between 2008 and 2019.

Districts 
Accra Metropolitan District (City of Accra)

The Accra Metropolitan District is one of the 13 local government districts that contains the historic center and the primary central business district (CBD) of Accra. To promote efficiency in the administrative machinery and also meet the ever-pressing demands for amenities and essential services, the district is divided into the Ashiedu Keteke, Okaikoi South, and Ablekuma South sub-metropolitan districts.

The Accra Metropolitan Assembly, which governs the City of Accra within the boundaries of the Accra Metropolitan District, is led by a Metropolitan Chief Executive who is appointed by the President of the Republic of Ghana. The Mayor of Accra is Mohammed Adjei Sowah, who was appointed by President Nana Akufo-Addo and approved unanimously by the AMA on 23 March 2017.

It includes 5 electoral areas: Korle Gonno, Korlebu, Chorkor, Mamprobi, and New Mamprobi.

Communities within the Okaikoi South sub-metropolitan district include Darkuman, New Fadama, Kaneshie, Bubiashie, and Avenor. The sub-metro has 8 electoral areas namely Awudome, Goten, Kaatsean, Mukose, Bubuashie, Bubui, Avenor and Kaneshie.

The Ashiedu Keteke sub-metropolitan district covers the Central Business District (CBD) and as such the hub of major commercial activities within the Metropolis. Majr markets include Makola, Agbogbloshie, and Kwasiodwaso. There are 8 electoral areas namely Ngleshie, Mudor, Kinka, Nmlitsagonno, Amamomo, Korle Wonkon, and Korle Dudor.

Ledzekuku Municipal District

Krowor Municipal District

The Krowor Municipal District was carved out of the Ledzokuku-Krowor Municipal District in 2018. Its administrative capital is Nungua.

La Dadekotopon Municipal District

The La Dadekotopon Municipal District, with its administrative capital at La, was carved out of the Accra Metropolitan District in 2012. The Kotoka International Airport, Airport City, Accra Mall, and the US Embassy are located within the district, which covers an area of  Other communities within this district include Cantonments, Labone, and Burma Camp.

Ablekuma North Municipal District

The Ablekuma North Municipal District was carved out of the Accra Metropolitan District in 2018 with an administrative capital at Darkuman Kokompe.

Ablekuma Central Municipal District

Its administrative capital is Lartebiokorshie.

Ablekuma West Municipal District
The Ablekuma West Municipal District was carved out of the Accra Metropolitan District in 2018 and its administrative capital is Dansoman.

Ayawaso East Municipal District
The Ablekuma East Municipal District was carved out of the Accra Metropolitan District in 2018 and its administrative capital is Nima.

Ayawaso North Municipal District
The Ablekuma North Municipal District was carved out of the Accra Metropolitan District in 2018 and its administrative capital is Accra Newtown.

Ayawaso Central Municipal District

The Ayawaso Central Municipal District was carved out of the Accra Metropolitan District with an administrative capital being Kokomlemle.

Ayawaso West Municipal District
The Ayawaso Central Municipal District was carved out of the Accra Metropolitan District and its administrative capital is Dzorwulu.

Okaikwei North Municipal District

Korley Kottey Municipal District

The Korley Klottey Municipal District was carved out of the Accra Metropolitan District in 2019 and covers an area of   Some of the communities within the district include Osu, Ringway Estates, Asylum Down, North Ridge, West Ridge, Ministries, Gold Coast City, North Adabraka, and Tudu. There are 9 electoral areas namely Osu Doku, Ringway Estates, Kinkawe, Osu Alata, Asylum Down, North Adabraka, Tudu, Odorna/Sahara, and Official Town.

Cityscape

Accra Central 
The Ring Road, extending from the Korle Lagoon in the west, north to Kwame Nkrumah Circle, following east to the juncture of Independence Avenue, and continuing on to Osu, forms a ring around the oldest districts of Accra, and separates central Accra from the outlying suburbs.

Central Accra includes the CBD, which consists of the historic districts of Usshertown, Tudu, Victoriaborg, West Ridge, and East Ridge, as well as the historic residential districts of Jamestown, Adabraka, Asylum Down, North Ridge and Christiansborg/Osu.

Although satellite business districts such as the Airport City have been established across the city, Central Accra remains the administrative and cultural centre of Accra, hosting government ministries, hotels, businesses, and financial institutions.

Central Accra's principal attractions include the Kwame Nkrumah Mausoleum, the National Museum, Independence Square, the National Theatre, and the Ohene Djan Stadium.

Accra North 
Northern Accra is a residential and business district. The area contains the "37" Military Hospital, The Flagstaff House, several foreign embassies, Achimota School, Achimota Golf Park, and the University of Ghana's Legon campus, which serves as Accra's northern boundary.

Geographically, the areas north of Ring Road West and Central, east of Winneba/Graphic Road, west of Liberation Road, and the districts just north and south of the Kwame Nkrumah motorway are regarded as Northern Accra. Some areas North of Accra include, Ashongnman, Madina, Haatso, North and West Legon and others.

Accra East 
Eastern Accra is largely residential and geographically north of Ring Road East, stretching as far north as Kwame Nkrumah Motorway; the district is bordered to the west by Liberation Road.

Accra West 
Western Accra is largely a residential and business area. Whilst geographically less expansive than the northern and eastern reaches of the city as a result of the large saltponds of Tettegu and Aplaku, it nonetheless boasts one of Accra's most important landmarks, the Korle Bu Teaching Hospital.

Geographically, the areas west of Ring Road West, extending as far west as the saltponds and south of Graphic Road, are considered Accra West.

Demographics 
The period between 1960 and 1970 saw rapid industrialization and expansion in Accra's manufacturing and commercial sectors. This contributed to high rural-urban migration to the city, and consequently a high population growth rate. The stagnation of the Ghanaian economy during the 1970s slowed the growth of Accra's population, as shown by the falling growth rate of the 1970–1984 intercensal years. Later, however, the decline in agriculture in rural communities in Ghana and rising industrialization in urban regions, coupled with the late-1980s boom in the service sector, once again propelled immigration to Accra. The primacy of the Accra Metropolitan Area as the Greater Accra region's administrative, educational, industrial and commercial center continues to be the major force for its population growth, with immigration contributing to over 35% of the Accra's population growth.

Distribution and density 
The gross density of population for the Accra Metropolitan Area in 2000 was 10.03 persons per hectare, compared to 6.23 per hectare in 1970. The highest densities were recorded in the Accra Metropolitan Assembly, with an overall average of 69.3 persons per hectare. At the community level, densities exceeding 250 persons per hectare occurred mostly in the immigrant and depressed areas in the oldest parts of Accra, such as Accra New Town, Nima, Jamestown and Usshertown. In higher-income areas, densities ranged between 17.5 and 40 persons per hectare.

Population distribution by age and gender 
Accra's population is a very youthful one, with 56% of the population being under 24 years of age. This predominance of young people is not expected to decline in the foreseeable future. Fifty-one percent (51%) of the population are females, and the remaining 49% males. This gives a males-to-females ratio of 1:1.04. The greater number of females is a reflection of the nationwide trend, where the estimated ratio of males to females is 1:1.03.

Migration 
Decentralization is expected to reduce the migration rates in Accra. An assessment of the extent of migration to Accra, based on present locality and gender, reveals that 45% of residents in Accra are African immigrants from countries across the African continent.

Housing 

Parts of Central Accra comprise a mixture of very low-density development with under-used service infrastructure on the one hand, high-density development and overstretched infrastructure services on the other. The growth of Accra has led to the neglect of some of the old settlements, whilst efforts are being made to provide the newly developing suburban areas with services and infrastructure to cater for the needs of the middle-income earners. Peripheral residential development in Accra barely has sufficient infrastructure to support it. There are also large numbers of uncompleted houses, interspersed with pockets of undeveloped land, which are often subject of litigation, due to the inability of organisations and individuals who own them to complete or develop them due to lack of funds. Housing can be grouped into three broad categories: the low-income, middle-income and high-income areas. The low-income housing areas comprise Osu, Jamestown, Adedenkpo, Chorkor, La, Teshie, Nungua, Sukura, Kwashieman, Odorkor, Bubiashie, Abeka, Nima, Maamobi and Chorkor. Altogether, these areas accommodate about 58% of Accra's total population. Most of Accra's informal businesses are located in low-income areas.

Almost all low-income areas are built up with little room for expansion. This is particularly so in the areas of the inner city. The middle-income areas of Accra are predominantly populated by Ghanaian citizens and business, administrative and professional families. Much of the housing in these areas has been provided by state, parastatal and private sector organisations and individuals. The middle-income areas include Dansoman Estates, North Kaneshie Estates, Asylum Down, Kanda Estates, Abelempke, Achimota, Adenta and Tesano. Usually, these areas, unlike the low-income areas, are planned developments, but are in need of infrastructure services. Building materials and general housing conditions are of better quality. The middle-income group comprises 32% of the city's population of which are Ghanaian citizens make up. The high-income areas provide housing for the remaining 10% of the population of which Ghanaian citizens also make up. They include areas like North Ridge and West Ridge, Ringway Estates, north Labone Estates, Airport Residential Area, Roman Ridge, East Legon.

These areas are all planned and have well developed infrastructure with spacious and landscaped ground in sharp contrast with, particularly, the low-income areas. Buildings are usually built with sandcrete blocks, and have walls and roofed with aluminium, or asbestos roofing sheets. There are also high-income peripheral areas like Haatso, Kwabenya, Pokuase, Adenta, Taifa, Mallam, where development of engineering infrastructure is not yet complete. These areas developed ahead of infrastructure, however the Achimota-Ofankor controlled-access highway was scheduled to open in May 2012, dual carriageway road construction was also due to be completed in 2012. In total, 84.4% of all houses in the Accra Metropolitan Area have their outside walls made up of cement. Similarly, houses found within Accra have 99.2% of their floor materials made up of cement.

Economy 
In 2008, the World Bank estimated that Accra's economy only constituted around US$3 billion of Ghana's total gross domestic product (GDP). The economically active population of Accra is estimated to be 823,327.

Accra is a centre for manufacturing, marketing, finance, insurance, and transportation. Its financial sector incorporates a central bank, nine commercial banks (with 81 branches), four development banks (with 19 branches), four merchant banks (with seven branches), three discount houses, one home finance mortgage bank, multiple building societies, Ghana Stock Exchange, foreign exchange bureaus, finance houses, insurance companies, insurance brokerage firms, two savings and loans companies, and numerous real estate developers, with industrial sites and residential developments. The road network in the Accra Metropolitan Area totals  in length.

There are over 50,506 identified residential properties in Accra, and about 4,054 commercial/industrial/mixed properties, with a total rateable value of GH¢13,849,014. There are also supermarkets, 36 facilities for both on–street and off-street parking, and shopping malls, as well as several facilities for sports and recreation.

Sectors of the economy 
The sectors of Accra's economy consist of the primary, secondary (manufacturing, electricity, gas, water, construction) and tertiary sectors (supermarkets, shopping malls, hotel, restaurant, transportation, storage, communication, financial intermediation, real estate service, public administration, education, health and other social services). The tertiary service sector is the city's largest, employing about 531,670 people. The second-largest, the secondary sector, employs 22.34% of the labour force, or around 183,934 people. 12.2% of the city's workforce are reportedly unemployed, totalling around 114,198 people.

Primary sector 

Accra's smallest economic sector, the primary sector, employs approximately 91,556 people. The predominant economic activities are fishery and urban agriculture, with fishery accounting for 78% of production labour. Urban agriculture in Accra centres on the growth of vegetables, several crops and poultry. The fishery industry is the most important sub-sector, with 10% of the catch being exported and the rest consumed locally. The industry is characterised by extreme seasonableness, operating primarily between June and September. Although most deep-water Atlantic fishing around Accra takes place in the June–September period, fishery operations take place close to the shore throughout the year, and there are clear indications of the depletion of fish stocks in the near future. Fishing operations are most prominent at the Jamestown, La, Teshie, Nungua and Chorkor fishing shores.

Education

Pre-school 
Pre-school comprises nursery and kindergarten. In 2001, there were 7,923 children (3,893 girls and 4,030 boys) in pre-schools in Accra. In 2010, the enrolment rate at Pre-school was 98%. Pre-schools are regulated by the Ministry of Employment and Social Welfare, and are mostly privately owned and operated. In 2001, there were 62 government-owned pre-schools in the Accra metropolis.

Primary school 
Primary school enrolment of girls is higher than that of boys. In 2010, the enrollment rate at primary school level was 95%.

Junior high school (JHS) 
The Junior High School is part of Ghana's basic education program. Its nationwide implementation began on 29 September 1987.

In the 2001/2002 academic year, 61,080 pupils had enrolled in Accra, representing 57.17% of the 129,467 school-age 12–to-14-year-olds. In 2010, the enrolment rate at Junior high school level was 95%. The ratio of girls is also higher at this level.

Senior high school (SHS) 

The transition rate between junior high and senior high school increased from 30 per cent in 1990 to 50 per cent in 2001. The number of students grew by 23,102 between 1990 and 2005, an increase of about 2,310 a year, since 2010 the senior high school enrolment rate has been 95%.

Ghana International School (GIS), a private non-profit A-Level school founded in 1955 for children from ages 3–18, is located in Accra's Cantonments. Abelemkpe is the home of Lincoln Community School, a private, non-profit International Baccalaureate (IB) school for students aged 3–18, established in 1968. The American International School and Abundant Grace Academy are also situated in Accra.

A number of notable public secondary schools lie on the outskirts of Accra: Achimota School, commonly referred to as "Motown", which was founded in 1924 and opened in 1927; the Accra Academy, known as "Accra Aca"; the Presbyterian Boys' Secondary School in Legon, commonly known as "Presec"; Wesley Grammar School – WESS-G Dansoman, St. Mary's Senior High School commonly referred to as "Merriez"- is a well-known girls' boarding school in Ghana; St. Thomas Aquinas Senior High School, commonly known as "Quinas"; Accra High School commonly known as ("Ahisco"); West Africa Secondary School, commonly known as "WASS"; the Accra Girls' Senior High School, commonly known as "Agiss";Kaneshie Secondary Technical School ("Kateco"); the Armed Forces Secondary Technical; and St. John's Grammar School; among others.

Universities 
A number of other public and private universities and tertiary institutions have since been founded in Accra, some of which are listed below.

Healthcare

Hospitals 
See List of hospitals in the Greater Accra Region.

Environment

Water 
As a growing city, Accra has a water supply and scarcity challenge. Water access uses a patchwork of different delivery processes.

Pollution 

Accra as a rapidly growing city, with lots of vehicles and other urban pollution sources, has also an increasing amount of air pollution and plastic pollution. Accra's urban ecosystem has been a site of dumping by international waste networks, with the Agbogbloshie suburb known for its highly toxic e-waste recycling sites, and the Kantamanto Market as handling an overwhelming flow of used fast fashion from other parts of the world. Both sites are sources of pollution and trash for other parts of the urban ecosystem.

Air pollution varies seasonally, but the average measure PM2.5 average concentration of 49.5 μg/m3. Live monitoring of air pollution is done at three sites in the city of Accra. A 2021 review by the Environmental Protection Agency in Ghana found that the levels were well exceeding both national and international standards for health.

Plastic management is also an increasing challenge. Use of plastic water bottles, water sachets and other packaging for food safety, as well as increased use of plastic during events like COVID-19. The beaches around Accra have significant plastic pollution, and surrounding fisheries are heavily impacted by plastics. Multiple non-profit organizations have been formed to collect the plastic and an increasingly growing network of recyclers and informal waste recovery networks. However, activists and researchers largely attribute the issue to upstream use of plastics.

Green spaces 
Rapidly growing population and construction within the city has been resulting in a reduction in Urban green space. A 2021 study of low income communities in the city found increasing concern and desire among these communities for urban green spaces for recreation and health. A 2018 study of greenspaces in the city, found the ones that do exist are important for mammal biodiversity in the city.

Transportation 

Accra is on the Atlantic coast but it has not served as a port city since the 1950s. Instead, the Port of Tema, about 29 km to the east along the Atlantic coast, was developed for deepwater shipping to and from Ghana as it can accommodate larger ships; the port opened in 1961. Tema is part of the metropolitan area of Accra.

Transport within Accra includes roads and rails, and an international airport

Rapid transit 
Public transpots exists between Accra and major cities such as Kumasi; Tamale, Mim, Ahafo ; Cape Coast, Sunyani; Takoradi; Tema; Ho; Wa; Bolgatanga; Elubo; Aflao, Techiman;

In 2003, the Metro Mass Transit Service, was inaugurated in Accra as a more comfortable and cheaper alternative to the trotro.

Accra is served by the Aayalolo bus system, which was inaugurated in November 2016. It was initially planned as a bus rapid transit with dedicated lanes, but because these lanes were not provided it was renamed Quality Bus System (QBS).

An agreement was signed in 2019 to build a five line, automated, elevated light railway metro system called Accra Skytrain. As of 2021 construction has not commenced on the $2.6 billion project. The government said in February 2021 it intends to proceed with the project which will developed under a build-own-operate concession by private South African firm.

Accra is connected by railway line to Kumasi and Takoradi.
There is a suburban railway line from Accra Central Station to Tema.

Aviation 
Accra is served by Kotoka International Airport, which has both civil and military uses. Located  from downtown Accra, the airport handles all of the city's scheduled passenger services. There are plans to build a second airport to relieve the aviation pressure on the Kotoka International Airport. This new airport will be located at Prampram in Accra and will be constructed by China Airport Civil Construction. This plan was still under review in 2020, as additional runways at Kotoka are in consideration as an alternative to a new international airport.

Taxis 

Accra has an extensive taxi network and numerous taxi ranks, but most taxis lack a meter system, so price negotiation is required between the passenger and driver. Metered taxis do operate in the city, but tend to be more expensive. Taxis in Ghana are painted in two colors: the four bumpers fenders are yellow/orange, and the rest of the car is in a color of the operator's choice.

Tro tros and buses 

By far the most common form of transport in Accra, tro tros (minibuses or cargo vans modified for passenger transport) is the third biggest, and second most efficient and cost-effective way of getting around the city. The buses are typically minibuses or vans. Some of the most popular models used as tro tros are Nissan Urvan 15-seaters and Mercedes Benz Sprinter or D 309 vans. Trotros are typically decorated with decals such as flags of various countries or (local and international) soccer teams, popular sayings, proverbs (in English or local languages) or Bible verses. Trotros pick up and offload passengers at designated bus stops along their regular routes. Tro tros will also usually offload at undesignated locations along the route, by passenger request. Most routes commence and terminate at large urban transport terminals such as the Neoplan station or the Achimota Transport Terminal.

Sport 

Football is the most popular sport in Accra. The most famous football club in the city is Accra Hearts of Oak, whose main rivals are Asante Kotoko of Kumasi. The Accra Sports Stadium is home to the Hearts of Oak, and a host venue of the Black Stars, the national football team of Ghana. In 2008, the Accra Sports Stadium hosted nine matches in the 2008 African Cup of Nations.

Another notable club is Accra Lions FC, which also plays in the Accra Sports Stadium.

Accra is home to the Right to Dream Academy, which gives young Ghanaians a chance at a career in professional football. Many of the academy's alumni, including Chicago Fire's David Accam, Helsingborg's Ema Boateng, Halmstad's King Gyan and Manchester City's Godsway Donyoh and Enock Kwakwa, as well as Ghana national team players, Brimah Razak, Harrison Afful, John Boye, Jonathan Mensah, Mohamed Awal, Yaw Frimpong, Mohammed Rabiu, Paul de Vries, Seidu Bancey, Mahatma Otoo, Asamoah Gyan, Latif Mohammed, Yahaya Mohamed, Theophilus Annorbaah, Michael Essien, Yussif Raman Chibsah, Kwadwo Asamoah, Joshua Otoo, Nuru Sulley, David Addy, Jerry Akaminko, Daniel Opare and Foli Adade, were also born in Accra.

Boxing is also popular, with many former world champions coming out of Ghana, including Azumah Nelson, Joshua Clottey, and Ike Quartey.

Accra will host the 2023 African Games.

Places of worship 

Among the places of worship, they are predominantly Christian churches and temples : Church of the Province of West Africa (Anglican Communion), Presbyterian Church of Ghana, Evangelical Presbyterian Church, Ghana (World Communion of Reformed Churches), Ghana Baptist Convention (Baptist World Alliance), Lighthouse Chapel International, Church of Pentecost, Assemblies of God, Roman Catholic Archdiocese of Accra (Catholic Church). There are also Muslim mosques.

Notable places of worship in the city include the Holy Trinity Cathedral, Wesley Methodist Cathedral, Ebenezer Presbyterian Church, Osu, Holy Spirit Cathedral, the Ghana National Mosque, the Madina Mosque, and the Mormon Accra Ghana Temple.

Culture 

Tourism in Ghana accounted for 1,087,000 international tourist arrivals in 2011.
Accra is the Greater Accra region's tourist hub, sporting a wide variety of hotels, monuments, museums and nightclubs. The city has three five-star hotels: the Labadi Beach Hotel, the La Palm Royal Beach Hotel and the Movenpick Ambassador Hotel. The Golden Tulip Hotel and Novotel Accra, located in Accra's central business district, are both ranked four stars. There are numerous three-star hotels, including the Hotel Wangara, Hotel Shangri-La and Erata Hotel, as well as many budget hotels. The Accra International Conference Centre and other meeting facilities provide venues for conference tourism.

The Du Bois Centre houses a research library and gallery of manuscripts, as well as the graves of its namesake, the scholar W.E.B. Du Bois, and his wife Shirley Graham Du Bois. The Kwame Nkrumah Mausoleum is the resting place of Ghana's first President, Kwame Nkrumah, who oversaw the Gold Coast's independence from Britain and was a leading exponent of Pan-Africanism.

The National Theatre in Accra, home of the National Symphony Orchestra Ghana

Accra furthermore hosts the National Museum, National Theatre, with its distinctive modern Chinese architecture.

The city's foremost historical site is the Jamestown area, which contains the Ussher Fort and James Fort, and Osu Castle (also known as Christiansborg), built by Danish settlers in the 17th century.

Other sites of note include the Jubilee House (the office of the Government of Ghana and the President of Ghana), the Parliament House of Ghana, the Ghana-India Kofi Annan Centre of Excellence in ICT, the Black Star Square, Accra Sports Stadium, and the Accra Centre for National Culture. The Accra-based African Fashion Foundation supports the African fashion industry, especially the fashion industry in Ghana.

The beachfront area also houses the Academy of African Music and Arts.

Ghana's film industry is growing. Its first documentary addressing the impacts of climate change premiered in Accra on 14 October 2022. The Ghana Youth Film Program is a compilation film of 12 documentary short films made youth from across Ghana aged 18 to 30. It will participate in the United Nations climate summit, COP27, 9 November 2022.

Twin towns – sister cities 
Accra has four official sister cities, as recognised by Sister Cities International:

UNESCO World Book 
In October 2022, Accra was named by the United Nations Educational, Scientific and Cultural Organization (UNESCO) as World Book Capital for 2023.

See also 

 2015 Accra explosion
 Atomic Junction Gas Explosion
 List of people from Accra

References

Bibliography

External links 

 "Accra Night Life Still Dey Pap", Afrosages.com, 22 January 2020

 
1961 establishments in Ghana
Capitals in Africa
Dutch Gold Coast
Former Danish colonies
Former Dutch colonies
Former Portuguese colonies
Populated coastal places in Ghana
Populated places established in the 15th century
Populated places in the Greater Accra Region
Port cities in Africa
Portuguese Gold Coast
Regional capitals in Ghana